East Torrens Messenger is a weekly suburban newspaper in Adelaide, part of the Messenger Newspapers group. The East Torrens''' area is bounded by Hackney Road to the west, the River Torrens Valley to the north, Magill Road to the south and the Athelstone foothills in the east.

The newspaper generally reports on events of interest in its distribution area, including the suburbs of Payneham, Magill, Athelstone and Paradise. It also covers the City of Campbelltown and City of Norwood Payneham & St Peters.

It has a circulation of 33,123 and a readership of 44,000.

History

The Payneham Messenger was established in 1984. In 2000, the paper was renamed the East Torrens Messenger''.

References

External links
 Messenger Newspapers
 East Torrens Messenger

Newspapers published in Adelaide
Weekly newspapers published in Australia